Jose Parada (born September 24, 1987 in Houston, Texas) is an American soccer player.

Career

College and Amateur
Parada grew up in Houston, Texas, attended Bellaire High School, played club soccer for nine years with the Houstonians and four years of college soccer at the University of Tulsa. In his freshman year, he tallied five goals and four assists in 19 games, 16 of which were starts. He was named to the Great Western Downtown Plaza/Golden Hurricane Classic All-Tournament team, as well as being named to the All-C-USA second team and All-C-USA Freshmen team. In his sophomore year, he tallied six goals and four assists in 16 appearances with 12 starts. He was named to the NSCAA All-Midwest second team. In his junior year, he tallied seven goals and five assist, and started all 17 games he appeared in. He was named to the Level 3 & Radisson Hotel Hurricane Classic All-Tournament team. In his senior year, he tallied nine goals and five assists in 22 appearances with 18 starts. He was named to both the NIU Invitational and SMU Classic all-tournament teams.

Professional
Parada signed to the Silverbacks in February 2011. He earned his first professional cap on April 16, 2011 in a home loss to FC Edmonton when he subbed in for Mario Pérez in the 88th minute. Parada was released by Atlanta on November 7, 2011.

References

External links
Atlanta Silverbacks bio
University of Tulsa bio

1987 births
Living people
American soccer players
Tulsa Golden Hurricane men's soccer players
Atlanta Silverbacks players
North American Soccer League players
Association football midfielders